North Shore Middle School may refer to:
 North Shore Middle School - Cloverleaf, Texas (Houston address) - Galena Park Independent School District
 North Shore Middle School - Wisconsin - Hartland-Lakeside School District